Hoarwithy can refer to:

Hoarwithy, Herefordshire, an English village
Hoarwithy (Viburnum lantana, the Wayfaring tree), a shrub of the genus Viburnum